Ciudad Delgado is a municipality in the San Salvador department of El Salvador. It is a part of the Metropolitan Area of San Salvador.

Municipalities of the San Salvador Department